Inside Edition is an American news broadcasting newsmagazine program that is distributed in first-run syndication by CBS Media Ventures. Having premiered on January 9, 1989, it is the longest-running syndicated-newsmagazine program that is not strictly focused on hard news. Though it does feature the latter, the rest of each day's edition mainly features a mix of infotainment stories, entertainment news and gossip, scandals, true-crime stories and lifestyle features.

Since 1995, the program's weekday broadcasts have been anchored by Deborah Norville. Mary Calvi anchors the program's weekend editions and also serves as a substitute for Norville on the weekday broadcasts, and Steven Fabian fills in and substitute-anchors the program's weekend- and weekday editions and also serves as a substitute for Calvi on the weekend broadcasts, and Fabian also serves as a substitute for Norville on the weekday broadcasts.

Overview

Format
Inside Edition is broadcast in two formats: the weekday edition is broadcast as a half-hour program and features a broad mix of news stories of various types and feature segments; a weekend edition (titled Inside Edition Weekend, though visually referenced as Inside Weekend in on-air graphics) is also produced, which also runs for a half-hour, and is composed of a selection of stories featured on the Monday through Friday editions the previous week. During major holidays occurring on a weekday, that episode may feature a format similar to the weekend edition but featuring a compilation of stories from past editions and occasionally features lifestyle-oriented stories in relation to certain major holidays (such as Independence Day, Thanksgiving and Christmas); from 2002 to 2012, certain episodes aired during the summer months also followed a similar format, mixing feature packages from past episodes introduced by the anchor of that day's broadcast with current news stories introduced by one of the program's correspondents from its newsroom.

The program is based at Studio 45 at the CBS Broadcast Center in Manhattan, which houses its main newsroom and production facilities as well as the set for the broadcast (which switched from a physical set to a virtual studio in September 2013). Some editions, however, are conducted from the program's West Coast newsroom in Los Angeles (from where the program's L.A.-based correspondents sometimes introduce story packages) or on location at the studios of television station which carry the program or from the sites of events which are being covered for the broadcast. Inside Edition is transmitted live via satellite at 3:00 p.m. Eastern Time Zone each Monday through Friday, with occasional updates to each broadcast being conducted to account for new story details or other timely news pieces, and to correct technical or script issues in the original live broadcast.

The program was among the first directly affected by the impact of the COVID-19 pandemic on March 8, 2020 (the day where the COVID-19 was declared a pandemic); as the CBS Broadcast Center (and thus, the Inside Edition newsroom and studio) was closed after building personnel tested positive for the virus. For the first week after, Deborah Norville originated the program from her home kitchen and subsequently later shot remotely from her home, with contributions from the Los Angeles newsroom before being able to establish a dedicated virtual home studio with the entire staff remote working, as the Los Angeles base was also affected by a stay-at-home order.

History

The program was created by John Tomlin and Bob Young, whose concept was picked up by King World Productions (which CBS Corporation – itself having acquired King World through its December 2005 split from Viacom – folded into CBS Television Distribution in September 2007; both CBS and Viacom would re-merge as ViacomCBS in 2019) in the winter of early 1988, for a debut during the 1988–89 television season. When Inside Edition first premiered in January 1989, the program's format originally took on a high-brow approach, focusing on general news and investigative journalism. The first anchor of the program was David Frost, who was demoted to a correspondent role after approximately three weeks, due to poor ratings under the original concept.

In February of that year, Frost was replaced as main anchor by ABC News reporter Bill O'Reilly. By then, the program had shifted towards a mix of tabloid crime stories, investigations and celebrity gossip. In point of fact, Inside Edition was one of the original "Big Three" tabloid journalism-style newsmagazines of the early 1990s on American television – alongside Fox's A Current Affair and Paramount's Hard Copy – which fiercely competed with each other in syndication during that period (and is the only one that remains on the air). In addition to being one of the first American broadcasters to cover the dismantling of the Berlin Wall, O'Reilly obtained the first exclusive interview with murderer Joel Steinberg and was the first television host from a national current affairs program on the scene of the 1992 Los Angeles riots.

In September 1992, the program launched a spin-off newsmagazine, Inside Edition Extra, which was co-produced by King World and then CBS affiliate WHDH (channel 7, now an independent station), which broadcast its parent series in the Boston market. Tom Ellis, who had previously served as an anchor at WHDH, served as host of the program. Unlike its parent show, Inside Edition Extra was not able to attain high ratings and was canceled at the end of the 1992–93 season; it would be replaced by American Journal, which went on to a longer five-year run.

In July 1994, O'Reilly began expressing a desire to leave Inside Edition. In March 1995, a little over six years after the show premiered, O'Reilly would leave the program. Deborah Norville, who at the time was a weekend anchor for CBS News and who had previously been known for her brief stint as co-anchor of Today on NBC, was chosen to take over.

By the late 1990s, as its similarly formatted syndicated competitors had already begun waning in the ratings, the program tweaked its format in an effort to retain viewers. While its focus continued to revolve partly around entertainment and crime stories, it also began phasing in additional hard news content (consisting of select major headlines of given warranty and other notable general news and legal-related stories) as well as lifestyle and human-interest story features. In the late 2000s, as video sharing websites such as YouTube came into prominence, Inside Edition began incorporating viral video in most broadcasts, either those in relating to a news story covered in that day's edition or, more commonly, humorous or amazing videos (including clever marriage proposals, people and animals displaying interesting talents or stunts, active military personnel returning home from duty surprising family members and practical joke); videos of the latter type are typically included in the "D" block which closes each broadcast.

Criticism
In the 1990s, Inside Edition was classified by the Pew Research Center Project for Excellence in Journalism as "tabloid press" and a "pseudo news program".

On-air staff

Current on-air staff

Anchor
 Deborah Norville – anchor (1995–present)

Correspondents
 Megan Alexander – New York-based correspondent (2007–present)
 Paul Boyd – correspondent/weekend fill-in anchor (2020–present; previously served as weekend anchor/New York-based correspondent 2001–2014)
 Mary Calvi – weekend/weekday fill-in anchor (2020–present)
 Steven Fabian – New York-based correspondent/weekend/weekday fill-in anchor (2014–present)
 Lisa Guerrero – chief investigative correspondent (2006–present)
 Alison Hall - New York-based correspondent (2021–present)
 Astrid Martinez - correspondent (2022–present)
 Ann Mercogliano – New York-based correspondent (2015–present)
 Jim Moret – Los Angeles-based chief correspondent (2004–present)
 Victoria Recaño – Los Angeles-based correspondent (2002–2004, 2012–present)
 Les Trent – New York-based correspondent (2000–present)
 Sibila Vargas - correspondent (2022–present)

Former on-air staff
 Trish Bergin – weekend anchor/correspondent (2002–2003)
 Logan Byrnes – correspondent (?–?; now at WTIC-TV in Hartford)
 Tony Cox – correspondent (?–?)
 Don Criqui – weekend anchor/correspondent (1995–2002, longtime sports broadcaster for CBS and NBC)
 Rita Cosby – New York-based correspondent (2008–2009, still special correspondent)
 Kim Dean – correspondent (2004–2007, now at WRAL-TV in Raleigh)
 David Frost – inaugural anchor correspondent (1989, deceased)
 Rudy Giuliani – chief legal analyst (1990–1993, former New York City mayor and former presidential candidate)
 Nancy Glass – weekend anchor/senior correspondent (1992–1993, later host of American Journal)
 Stacey Gualandi – Los Angeles-based correspondent (1997–2006, now at Radar Online)
 Kristina Guerrero – Los Angeles-based correspondent (2007–2008, later at E! News)
 Star Jones – chief legal analyst (1994–1997, later co-host of The View and at TruTV)
 Rick Kirkham – correspondent (1989–1997)
 Diane McInerney – weekend/weekday fill-in anchor/New York-based correspondent (2003–2020)
 Matt Meagher – senior investigative correspondent (1989–2010)
 Bill O'Reilly – anchor/correspondent (1989–1995, later host of The O'Reilly Factor on Fox News)
 Jon Scott – reporter (1989–1992, now host/anchor of Fox Report Weekend on Fox News)
 Janet Tamaro – correspondent (1989–1994, 1996–1999)
 Rolonda Watts – senior correspondent, weekend anchor, and producer (1989–1993, later host of the syndicated talk show Rolonda)
 Steve Wilson – reporter (1992–1995, later at WXYZ-TV in Detroit)
 April Woodard – New York-based senior correspondent (2001–2014, now at WTKR in Norfolk)

Awards
 George Polk Award – Special Achievement in Journalism 1996
 Lifetime Achievement Award – Presented by the National Association of Consumer Agency Administrators, 2007

References

External links
 
 

1989 American television series debuts
1980s American television news shows
1990s American television news shows
2000s American television news shows
2010s American television news shows
2020s American television news shows
English-language television shows
Entertainment news shows in the United States
First-run syndicated television programs in the United States
Television series by CBS Studios
Television series by King World Productions
Television shows filmed in New York City
 
Conservative media in the United States